Jakub Kindl (born 10 February 1987) is a Czech professional ice hockey defenseman who is currently playing for Storhamar Hockey. He previously played in the National Hockey League (NHL) with the Detroit Red Wings and Florida Panthers.

Playing career
As a youth, Kindl played in the 2001 Quebec International Pee-Wee Hockey Tournament with a team from Chomutov.

Kindl played junior hockey for the Kitchener Rangers of the OHL and then for the Grand Rapids Griffins of the American Hockey League. Kindl was drafted 19th overall by the Detroit Red Wings in the 2005 NHL Draft.

During the 2005–06 season, Kindl played in three games for Grand Rapids, where he recorded one assist. During the 2007–08 season, he played in 75 games for Grand Rapids. He was called by the Detroit Red Wings as a spare defenceman. When Detroit won the Stanley Cup Kindl was included on the team, even though he had yet to play in the NHL. Detroit also awarded him a Stanley Cup ring. Since Kindl had not played in the NHL his name could not be included on the Stanley Cup.

Kindl made his NHL debut with the Red Wings during the 2009–10 NHL season. Called up as an injury replacement, he eventually appeared in three games before returning to Grand Rapids. Kindl scored his first career NHL goal on 20 January 2011 against Jaroslav Halak of the St. Louis Blues.

On 29 June 2013, Kindl signed a four year, $9.6 million contract extension with the Detroit Red Wings.

On 14 February 2015, the Red Wings assigned Kindl to the Grand Rapids Griffins for a conditioning assignment. Kindl has not played for the Red Wings since suffering an elbow injury on 27 December 2014. On 20 February 2015, the Red Wings recalled Kindl from his conditioning assignment with the Griffins. During his condition assignment, Kindl recorded one goal, and a plus-two rating in back-to-back wins for the Griffins.

On 9 January 2016, Kindl was placed on waivers and later assigned to the Grand Rapids Griffins. Prior to being placed on waivers, he played in 23 games with the Red Wings, recording two goals and three assists. His plus-3 rating in overtime leads the Wings this season. On 4 February, Kindl was recalled by the Red Wings. Prior to being recalled by the Red Wings, Kindl recorded two goals and one assist in nine games for the Griffins since he was assigned on 11 January. He was again assigned to the Griffins on 23 February.

On 27 February 2016, Kindl was traded by the Red Wings to the Florida Panthers in exchange for a sixth-round pick in the 2017 NHL Draft.

At the conclusion of his contract with the Panthers, Kindl left the NHL as a free agent and later returned to his homeland in signing a one-year deal with HC Plzeň of the Czech Extraliga on 18 October 2017.

After two seasons with Plzeň, Kindl left at the conclusion of his contract continuing his European career in Germany by agreeing to a one-year contract with Kölner Haie of the DEL on 5 July 2019.

On 2 December 2022, he signed for Storhamar Hockey in Fjordkraft-ligaen for the remainder of the 2022/23 season.

International play
Kindl represented the Czech Republic at the 2014 IIHF World Championship, where he recorded one goal and two assists in ten games.

Career statistics

Regular season and playoffs

International

References

External links 

1987 births
Living people
Czech expatriate ice hockey players in the United States
Czech ice hockey defencemen
Detroit Red Wings draft picks
Detroit Red Wings players
HC Dynamo Pardubice players
Florida Panthers players
Grand Rapids Griffins players
Kitchener Rangers players
Kölner Haie players
National Hockey League first-round draft picks
People from Šumperk
HC Plzeň players
Springfield Thunderbirds players
Sportspeople from the Olomouc Region
Czech expatriate sportspeople in Norway
Czech expatriate ice hockey players in Germany
Expatriate ice hockey players in Norway
Czech expatriate ice hockey players in Canada